Pernille Mosegaard Harder (born 15 November 1992) is a Danish professional footballer who plays as an attacking midfielder or a forward for FA Women's Super League club Chelsea and the Denmark national team. In September 2020, she became the world's most expensive female footballer following her transfer from VfL Wolfsburg to Chelsea, but the record was broken in September 2022 by Keira Walsh when she was signed to Barcelona. She is considered one of the best female footballers in the world.

Harder, who is also known for her LGBTQ+ advocacy, won the UEFA Women's Player of the Year Award in 2018 and 2020.

Club career

Early career

Harder played for Team Viborg and IK Skovbakken in her native Denmark's Elitedivisionen. Skovbakken had made Harder and her contemporary Sofie Junge Pedersen contracted players in April 2010, in recognition of their exceptional potential.

Linköpings FC
Harder chose Swedish club Linköpings FC for her next destination because she wanted a new challenge, but also because she wanted to remain in Scandinavia. In September 2013 she scored all four goals in Linköpings' 4–1 win at relegation-bound Sunnanå SK.

In the 2015 Damallsvenskan season, Harder scored 17 goals in 22 appearances for Linköping, winning a series of national awards including Årets Anfallare and Årets Allsvenska Spelare. At the annual awards gala, she shared the stage with male winner Zlatan Ibrahimović and was described as "hyper-talented" and "world-class" by Swedish national coach Pia Sundhage. Harder was also voted Danish Football Player of the Year in 2015. In June 2016, Harder was among 30 local worthies to be named in a Wall of Fame by Linköping Municipality.

Harder enjoyed further success in the 2016 Damallsvenskan season, retaining the League Player of the Year award. Her 23 league goals secured the Top Goalscorer award and helped Linköping win the Damallsvenskan title. By now a transfer target for the biggest clubs in women's football, Harder's agent announced in November 2016 that she would be leaving Linköping for a new challenge.

VfL Wolfsburg
In December 2016, it was announced that Harder had signed a two-and-a-half-year contract with VfL Wolfsburg running from January 2017. In all four seasons with the team, Harder won the Bundesliga and DFB-Pokal double. She also played in two Champions League finals (2018 and 2020), losing both to Lyon.

Chelsea
On 1 September 2020, Harder signed for Chelsea on a three-year contract for a world-record fee for a female footballer, reportedly in excess of £250,000. In the 2020–21 UEFA Women's Champions League quarter-finals, she scored in both legs against her former club VfL Wolfsburg.

International career
At the inaugural 2008 FIFA U-17 Women's World Cup in New Zealand, Harder was part of the Denmark team who won their group before losing 4–0 to eventual champions North Korea in the quarter-final. Still 16 years old, she contributed a hat-trick to a crushing 15–0 win over Georgia in her senior international debut in October 2009, and she has continued to score regularly for the Danish team ever since.

Harder scored further hat-tricks against Austria and Armenia in 2011 and Russia in 2013. She was named in national coach Kenneth Heiner-Møller's Denmark squad for UEFA Women's Euro 2013. With nine goals she had been the team's top goalscorer in qualifying.

In October 2013, Harder won her 50th cap for Denmark in a 1–1 draw with Serbia. She scored Denmark's goal in the match. In March 2016, Harder was appointed captain of the national team.

In 2017, she was named in national coach Nils Nielsen's Denmark squad for the UEFA Women's Euro 2017. She captained the team to the final and scored a goal in Denmark's 4–2 defeat by hosts the Netherlands. She was voted runner-up to Lieke Martens in the UEFA Women's Player of the Year Award for 2016–17. On 16 September 2021, she became the record goalscorer of the Denmark national team, with her 66 goal in her 129 games. She was called up for the UEFA Women's Euro 2022 and scored the only goal for denmark, but was eliminated with the national team in the group stage.

Personal life
Since May 2014, Harder has been in a relationship with current Chelsea teammate and Swedish international, Magdalena Eriksson.

She and Magdalena Eriksson work with the charity Common Goal and pledged 1% of their salaries to help tackle social issues throughout football. The couple also both push for equality and LGBTQ+ rights in sport.

She has a Master's degree in Business administration.

She grew up as an avid Manchester United fan.

Career statistics

Club
.

International
Scores and results list Denmark's goal tally first, score column indicates score after each Harder goal.

Honours

Linköpings
 Damallsvenskan: 2016
 Svenska Cupen: 2014, 2015; runner-up: 2016
 Svenska Supercupen runner up: 2015, 2016

VfL Wolfsburg
 Bundesliga: 2016–17, 2017–18, 2018–19, 2019–20 
 DFB-Pokal: 2016–17, 2017–18, 2018–19, 2019–20
 UEFA Women's Champions League runner-up: 2017–18, 2019–20

Chelsea
 FA Women's Super League: 2020–21, 2021–22
 Women's FA Cup: 2020–21, 2021–22
 FA Women's League Cup: 2020–21
 UEFA Women's Champions League runner-up: 2020–21

Denmark
UEFA Women's Euro runner-up: 2017

Individual
 Danish Breakthrough Player of the Year: 2010 
 Danish Football Player of the Year: 2012, 2015, 2016, 2017, 2018, 2019, 2020 
 Damallsvenskan's Most Valuable Player: 2015, 2016
 Damallsvenskan Forward of the Year: 2015, 2016
 Damallsvenskan Top scorer: 2016
 FIFPro: FIFA FIFPro World XI: 2017, 2020
 UEFA Women's European Championship All Star Team: 2017
 Goal 50: 2017
 UEFA Women's Champions League Squad of the Season: 2016–17, 2017–18, 2018–19, 2019–20, 2020–21
 IFFHS Women's World Team: 2017, 2018, 2020
 Frauen-Bundesliga Top scorer: 2017–18, 2019–20
 UEFA Women's Player of the Year Award: 2017–18, 2019–20
 UEFA Women's Champions League Top scorer: 2018–19
 UEFA Champions League Forward of the Season: 2019–20
 The 100 Best Female Footballers In The World Winner: 2018, 2020 
 Niedersachsens Fußballer des Jahres: 2020
 Women's Footballer of the Year (Germany): 2020
 World Soccers Women's World Player of the Year: 2020
 IFFHS World's Best Woman Player: 2020
 IFFHS UEFA Woman Team of the Decade 2011–2020

 FA Women's Super League Goal of the Month: September 2021

Nominated for the Ballon d'Or Féminin (2018 2.place), (2019 14.place) (2021 7.place)

References

External links

 
 
 
 Danish football stats  at DBU
 
 

1992 births
Living people
Danish women's footballers
Denmark women's international footballers
Danish expatriate women's footballers
Danish expatriate sportspeople in Germany
Expatriate women's footballers in Germany
Danish expatriate sportspeople in Sweden
Expatriate women's footballers in Sweden
Danish expatriate sportspeople in England
Expatriate women's footballers in England
Damallsvenskan players
Linköpings FC players
Women's Super League players
VfL Wolfsburg (women) players
Chelsea F.C. Women players
People from Ikast-Brande Municipality
Women's association football forwards
Lesbian sportswomen
LGBT association football players
Danish LGBT rights activists
Danish LGBT sportspeople
Danish lesbians
FIFA Century Club
Sportspeople from the Central Denmark Region
UEFA Women's Euro 2022 players
UEFA Women's Euro 2017 players